The great Oulu fire of 1882 was a conflagration that started in the basement of the pharmacy on the corner of Kirkkokatu and Pakkahuoneenkatu on the evening of 2 November, destroying 27 buildings along Hallituskatu and Pakkahuoneenkatu in downtown Oulu, Finland, amongst them the city-owned Seurahuone. The basement was used to store gasoline and other flammable materials, which led to the fire quickly raging out of control. It headed towards the Oulu River and destroyed the salt and grain warehouses along its shoreline. The fire brigade, however, managed to keep the fire from spreading to the packhouse.

See also    
 Great Oulu fire (disambiguation)

References 
 Kustaa Hautala: Oulun kaupungin historia IV (Kirjapaino Oy Kaleva, 1976, Oulu)  s. 319–323

 

Fire 1882
1882 fires in Europe
Great Oulu Fire of 1882
November 1882 events